The Miss Chinese Toronto Pageant (多倫多華裔小姐競選), also known as MCTP, and formerly known as the Greater Toronto Chinese Pageant prior to 1999, is an annual beauty pageant organized by Fairchild TV that selects Toronto's representative for the annual Miss Chinese International Pageant, held in Hong Kong, organized by TVB.  It is unrelated to the now-discontinued Miss Chinese Scarborough Pageant which was also hosted in the same region. The current Miss Chinese Toronto is Nicole Xu (徐熙儀), winner of the 2022 pageant.

The winner of the pageant can then sign with Fairchild TV as a presenter, or often other popular contestants sign with Fairchild TV, even without a title. It is one of the most recognized beauty pageants among Chinese Canadian diaspora, alongside its Vancouver counterpart.

Requirements

Contestants must be of at least partial Chinese descent and have resided in Canada for continuous period of 6 months or a total of one year on the day the application form is signed. The age requirement is 17–27 (expanded in 2011).

Miss Chinese Toronto titleholders
This is a full list of winners since the pageant's inception in 1995, available on the Miss Chinese Toronto official website.

Winner charts

Full award winners list 2010–present
2010

2011

2012

2013

2014

2015

2016

2017

2018

2019

2020

2021

2022

Masters of ceremonies
1995: Dominic Lam 林嘉華
1996: Dominic Lam 林嘉華
1997: Dominic Lam 林嘉華
1998: Dominic Lam 林嘉華
1999: Dominic Lam 林嘉華
2000: Dominic Lam 林嘉華
2001: Dominic Lam 林嘉華
2002: Dominic Lam 林嘉華
2003: Dominic Lam 林嘉華, Jennifer Lo 羅爵暉, Diana Wu 吳丹
2004: Dominic Lam 林嘉華
2005: Dominic Lam 林嘉華
2006: Dominic Lam 林嘉華, Amigo Choi 崔建邦, River Lee 李亭
2007: Dominic Lam 林嘉華, Leo Shiu 蕭嘉俊
2008: Dominic Lam 林嘉華, Joey Leung 梁榮忠，Local Fairchild TV Hosts 當地著名節目主持人, Grace Xiao 曉露
2009: Dominic Lam 林嘉華, Castro Liu 廖立暉, Lily Cheng 陳伶俐
2010: Dominic Lam 林嘉華, Leo Shiu 蕭嘉俊, Grace Xiao 曉露
2011: Dominic Lam 林嘉華, Derek To 杜挺豪, Grace Xiao  曉露
2012: Dominic Lam 林嘉華, Derek To 杜挺豪, Leo Shiu 蕭嘉俊
2013: Leo Shiu 蕭嘉俊, Castro Liu 廖立暉, Qin Yi 秦屹
2014: Leo Shiu 蕭嘉俊 , Ong Yi Hing 王貽興, Qin Yi 秦屹
2015: Leo Shiu 蕭嘉俊, Marcus Kwok 郭田葰, Qin Yi 秦屹
2016: Leo Shiu 蕭嘉俊, Ken Chan 陳啟泰, Qin Yi 秦屹
2018: Leo Shiu 蕭嘉俊, Qin Yi 秦屹
2019: Leo Shiu 蕭嘉俊, Qin Yi 秦屹
2020: Leo Shiu 蕭嘉俊, Denise Liang 莎菲寶
2021: Leo Shiu 蕭嘉俊, Denise Liang 莎菲寶

Special performing guests
1995: Leo Ku 古巨基
1996: Not Available
1997: Not Available
1998: Not Available
1999: Not Available
2000: Not Available
2001: Not Available
2002: Not Available
2003: Ivan Ho 何念如
2004: Barry Yip 葉文輝
2005: Joe Ma 馬德鐘
2006: Moses Chan 陳豪
2007: Michael Tong 唐文龍
2008: Bosco Wong 黃宗澤
2009: Kenneth Ma 馬國明, Angel Wang 王倩 (Local Guest)
2010: Eric Suen 孫耀威
2011: Jerry Lamb 林曉峰
2012: Vincent Wong 王浩信
2013: Oscar Leung 梁烈唯
2014: Hubert Wu 胡鴻鈞
2015: Yao Bin 姚兵
2016: William Hu 胡渭康
2018: Kenneth Chan 陳啟泰 / Chén Qǐtài
2019: James Chou 羽田, Shuhei 長宇

MCT at Miss Chinese International Pageant
Toronto participated at Miss Chinese International 國際中華小姐競選 every year, except in 1989, 1994, and 1995. The representatives that participated before 1996 were all winners of the Greater Toronto Chinese Pageant.

1 Age at the time of the Miss Chinese International pageant

See also
Miss Chinese (Vancouver) Pageant
Miss Chinese International Pageant
Miss NY Chinese
Miss Chinese International Pageant 2009
Miss Chinese International Pageant 1997
Miss Chinese International Pageant 1992

References

External links
Miss Chinese Toronto Pageant 2020 Official Site
Miss Chinese Toronto Pageant 2019 Official Site
Miss Chinese Toronto Pageant 2018 Official Site
Pageant Organizer Fairchild Television Official Website
Miss Chinese Toronto 2006 Official Site
Miss Chinese Toronto Pageant 2007 Official Site
Miss Chinese Toronto Pageant 2007 Official Site

Toronto
Events in Toronto
Beauty pageants in Canada
1999 establishments in Ontario
Canada–China relations
Canada–Hong Kong relations
Canada–Taiwan relations
Women in Toronto